Keith McDermott (born September 28, 1953) is an American actor, theater director, and writer.

Life and career
McDermott was born September 28, 1953, in Houston, Texas, the son of Betty Ray (Rees) and James E. McDermott. McDermott graduated Ohio University Theatre School. In the 1970s, he lived with author Edmund White in New York City, and appeared as Alan Strang in Equus on Broadway opposite Richard Burton. He directs theater productions, and is particularly known for his direction of Off-Off-Broadway comedies penned by avant garde playwright Jim Neu. McDermott appeared in the Hollywood movie Without a Trace, as well as in numerous independent films, including as half the title role in Ignatz & Lotte and a small but very important role in the cult horror Tourist Trap.  His novel Acqua Calda was inspired by his long-term friendship and collaboration with director Robert Wilson, and his memoir of former long-time boyfriend Joe Brainard appeared in the anthology Loss Within Loss. His other memoir and fiction has appeared in periodicals, as well as in the anthology Boys Like Us

Filmography

Theater

Bibliography
 Acqua Calda, Carroll & Graf Publishers
 Lessons from Our Fathers, Durban House Publishing, due Oct 2006

See also
 LGBT culture in New York City
 List of LGBT people from New York City

References

 Review and photo at gaycitynews.com
 Interview
 Bio bits at Innerart.com

External links
 
 

1953 births
Living people
21st-century American novelists
American male novelists
American male film actors
American male stage actors
American gay actors
American gay writers
American LGBT novelists
LGBT people from Texas
20th-century American novelists
20th-century American male writers
21st-century American male writers